St. Peter's-By-The-Sea Episcopal Church, or variations, may refer to:

St. Peter's by-the-Sea Episcopal Church (Sitka, Alaska), listed on the National Register of Historic Places
Saint Peter's-By-The-Sea Episcopal Church (Cape May Point, New Jersey), listed on the NRHP 
St. Peter's By-The-Sea Protestant Episcopal Church (Cape Neddick, Maine), listed on the NRHP 
St. Peter's by-the-Sea Episcopal Church in the Central Street Historic District (Narragansett, Rhode Island)